Akeytsu is a 3D animation and rigging software focused on the game development market. It was built to create large volumes of 3D animation with simple tools.

History 
Akeytsu is developed by the company Nukeygara, which was co-founded in 2014 in Lyon, France, by Aurélien Charrier. He is an animator with 12 years experience in the video game industry. His aim with Akeytsu was to build a feature set that was intuitive and easy to use. The beta version was found to be a simple focused tool concentrated on animation.  Akeytsu was launched on Steam engine in 2016.

Features 
 Light rigging and skinning
 IK/FK
 One-click IK/FK reverse foot
 Rapid posing
 F-curves integrated with the viewport
 Rigging and animation any human or animal characters
 Onion skinning/ghosting
 Animation layers
 Cycle animation tools
 FBX import/export

References 

3D animation software
Companies based in Lyon